Aktan Arym Kubat (born March 26, 1957, Sokuluk District, Kyrgyzstan), also known as Aktan Abdykalykov, is a Kyrgyzstani director, screenwriter and actor. Member of the National Film Academy of the Kyrgyzstan, acting Member of the European Film Academy, acting Member of Asia Pacific Screen Academy.

Aktan Arym Kubat has received many industry awards, including Silver Leopard at the Locarno Film Festival, Bronze Lion at the Cannes Lions International Festival of Creativity, the FIPRESCI Prizes from International Federation of Film Critics, he was a participant of Un Certain Regard and Lа Quinzaine des Realisateurs at the Cannes Film Festival, Panorama section at the Berlin International Film Festival and other festivals.

Best known for the films Beshkempir/The Adopted Son , Maimyl/The Chimp , The Light Thief , Centaur .

In 2016, Aktan Arym Kubat was recognized as one of the best directors in Asia, and Beshkempir/The Adopted Son entered the top 100 Asian films of all time, released by the Busan International Film Festival, which conducted a survey among 73 prominent film professionals, film critics, festival executives, programmers and directors.

Biography 
Born in 1957, Aktan Arym Kubat was 13 when he learned that his mother and father were not his biological parents. Later, he explained in Russian that it was customary in his country for parents of a large family to offer a baby boy to an infertile couple. (Baby girls are considered undesirable.) In a time-honored ritual, five old women pass around the infant and name him Beshkempir. His birth mother was a geography teacher who already had nine children and so gave away her 8-month-old son to her brother. Kubat had a carefree childhood with no boundaries between him and his pals. He studied the required Russian language in school and roughhoused with other boys in the dusty, primitive village of Kuntu, where he still lives. Everyone told him he was fated to be an artist, and he would wish on a falling star, he said, that it would become true. As a youngster, he enjoyed the Russian and Indian movies shown at the little theater in his village. (In one scene in Beshkempir, villagers watch in wonder as a movie, showing a gaudy Indian song and dance number, is projected onto an outdoor screen.) He thought of films as windows to another world, he said.

In 1974, Aktan Arym Kubat graduated from Dzhamgerchinov High School, in Kuntuu village, and then went to Kyrgyz State Fine Arts College named after S. A. Chuykov, major in “Professor of painting and technical drawing”. After graduation, in 1980 he studied at the Creative Arts Workshop of People's Artist of the USSR Gapar Aitiev in Bishkek.
In 1981, he started working as a set decorator, production designer at the National Film Studio "Kyrgyzfilm". In the 90s he also proved to be a capable director who highlights his country’s pressing issues from a poetic angle.

In 1990, he made his directorial debut with a 17-minute film The Dog was Running documentary (production of “Kyrgyzfilm” studio) co-authored with Erkin Ryspaev, and in 1992 he released his first feature film Where is your home?. The Swing, his second feature, a semi-autobiographical tale about the discovery of the world by an 11-year-old boy who is infatuated with an older girl, won the Grand Prize for the best short film at the Locarno Film Festival in the competition section for short films in 1993 and the FIPRESCI Prize at the Torino Film Festival. This event gave Aktan Arym Kubat an opportunity to meet his French producer Cédomir Kolar, who later became the main producer of his main films. Five years later in 1998 at the Locarno Film Festival he won a Silver Leopard for Beshkempir/The Adopted Son, which also competed at the Karlovy Vary International Film Festival in the East of the West Competition. In 2001 Maimyl/The Chimp was selected to Un Certain Regard in Cannes and was nominated by the European Film Academy for the Discovery Award. The Light Thief, in which Aktan Arym Kubat took the lead role, premiered at Director's Fortnight in Cannes, won numerous awards and was screened in many festivals such as Locarno, Toronto, Montreal, Viennale, Doha and others. In 2017 this experience in front of the camera had a great effect once again in Centaur, which premiered in Berlinale’s Panorama section and won CICAE Award at Berlinale IFF, “Best Actor” award at Asian World Film Festival in USA and other prestigious awards.

In 1998, Aktan Arym Kubat created his own studio "Beshkempir". Since 2004, he is a founder and art director of the producing company “Oy Art”.

Mirlan Abdykalykov, the son of Aktan Arym Kubat, played the lead role in his autobiographical trilogy The Swing, Beshkempir/The Adopted Son and Maimyl/The Chimp. In the interview during the Rotterdam Film Festival in January 2002, Aktan Arym Kubat said: "... It was like the periods of my life: childhood, adolescence and becoming an adult... The events of The Swing were drawn from direct experiences. I was an adopted son and I had the nickname ape, the chimp. Furthermore, when I was a young boy, I was in love with my neighbour and I followed here everywhere... Another painful memory from my childhood that found its way to the film is growing up with an alcoholic father... This is an autobiographical trilogy, I thought of someone closest to me to interpret my ideas, feelings and emotions, and I chose my son..."

In the next films The Light Thief and Centaur, Aktan Arym Kubat played the lead roles himself.

Social work 
Aktan Arym Kubat actively participates in public activities in the field of cinema, he is one of the initiators and developers of the Target Program “Kyrgyzstan's Cinematography - 2010”, which has key segments such as education in cinema, film production, technical equipment, distribution and promotion of cinema, copyright, popularization of the author cinema in Kyrgyzstan. Since 2005, as a founding member of Public Organization "Cinema Development Fund" he participated in the development and implementation of such projects as “DVD-collection Kyrgyz Miracle” - restoration, digitalization and English subtitling of 10 best Kyrgyz classic films", "Art House Film Festival", "Film directors’ courses", "Training program for film producers and art managers" and other various master-classes and courses for cinematographers.

Honors 
 Laureate of Manas Order of the Second Degree (Kyrgyzstan)
 Laureate of the Toktogul State Award (Kyrgyzstan)
 Laureate of the Youth Union Prize (Kyrgyzstan)

Filmography and awards (selected)

References

External links 

Aktan Arym Kubat at the Internet Movie Database IMDb
Official Facebook Page of Aktan Arym Kubat
Official YouTube channel
'Centaur': Film Review by The Hollywood Reporter, Berlinale 2017
Centaur: An honest and simple approach to timeless themes, Berlinale 2017
Film Review: ‘Centaur’ by Variety, July 13, 2017
Film Review: The Light Thief by The Hollywood Reporter, Cannes 2010
Film Review: The Light Thief (Svet-Ake) by Screen Daily, Locarno 2010
Film Review: The Chimp  by Variety, 2001
Film Review: the Adopted Son; Growing Up in Kyrgyzstan, Boys Will Be Boys by The New York Times, 1999

1957 births
Living people
Kyrgyzstani screenwriters
Kyrgyzstani film directors